The 2019 FA Community Shield (also known as The FA Community Shield supported by McDonald's for sponsorship reasons) was the 97th FA Community Shield, an annual football match played between the winners of the previous season's Premier League and FA Cup. As Manchester City won both competitions in 2019, their opponents were the 2018–19 Premier League runners-up, Liverpool.

The match was played at Wembley Stadium on 4 August 2019. Manchester City defended the trophy they won in 2018, winning 5–4 on penalties.

Background

In the 2018–19 season, Liverpool and Manchester City were in a heated title race, each going unbeaten in their first 15 league matches, and never more than three points apart in the table after the end of February. Despite being nine points behind Liverpool at Christmas, Manchester City won the league with 98 points, a point ahead of Liverpool. Manchester City also won the 2018–19 FA Cup and the 2018–19 EFL Cup, beating Watford 6–0 in the former, and defeating Chelsea 4–3 in a penalty shoot-out after a 0–0 draw in the latter.

During 2018–19 the two teams only met in the league, playing out a goalless draw at Anfield on 7 October, as City's Riyad Mahrez missed a crucial penalty kick in the 84th minute, before Manchester City won 2–1 at the City of Manchester Stadium on 3 January, with goals from Sergio Agüero and Leroy Sané for City either side of Roberto Firmino's effort for Liverpool. That game was Liverpool's only loss during the 2018–19 Premier League season.

This is the third super cup in which Liverpool's Jürgen Klopp and Manchester City's Pep Guardiola have faced each other. While they were each managing Der Klassiker rivals Borussia Dortmund and Bayern Munich respectively, they played against each other in the 2013 and 2014 DFL-Supercups, the German equivalent of the Community Shield. Klopp's side won on both occasions, with scores of 4–2 and 2–0 respectively. Both matches were played at Westfalenstadion, Dortmund's home stadium.

Manchester City wore a commemorative kit with no sponsor for the match, marking their 125th anniversary season.

Match

Summary
Manchester City took the lead after 12 minutes when Kevin De Bruyne knocked the ball into the penalty area from the left to David Silva who flicked it to Raheem Sterling who scored from six yards out, hitting the ball with his left foot under Liverpool goalkeeper Alisson who almost managed to keep it out of the net. In the second half Virgil van Dijk had a shot from close range on the turn which came back off the underside of the bar and bounced out to safety. Liverpool equalized in the 77th minute when Joël Matip scored with a header from three yards out after a cross from the left by Virgil van Dijk.	
Mohamed Salah had a late chance to win the game but his initial shot was saved by Claudio Bravo with Salah following up with a header which was hooked off the line by Kyle Walker. The match went to a penalty shoot-out with Georginio Wijnaldum the only player to miss, Claudio Bravo saving to his right. Gabriel Jesus scored the winning penalty shooting to the left past Alisson to decide the match.

Details

References

2019
Community Shield
Charity Shield 2019
Charity Shield 2019
Community Shield 
Events at Wembley Stadium
Community Shield
Fa Community Shield 2019